Panitheeratha Veedu is a 1973 Indian Malayalam-language film, directed by K. S. Sethumadhavan. The film stars Prem Nazir, Nanditha Bose, Roja Ramani and Jose Prakash. It is an adaptation of Parappurath's 1964 novel of the same name. It won the Kerala State Film Awards for Best Film, Best Direction, Best Story and Best Singer (Jayachandran). It also won the National Film Award for Best Feature Film in Malayalam & also won two Filmfare Awards South.

Cast

Prem Nazir as Jose
Nanditha Bose as Rachel (dubbed by KPAC Lalitha)
Shobhana (Roja Ramani) as Leela
Jose Prakash as Hari's Father
Prem Prakash as Hari
Sam
Abbas as Muthalaali
Adoor Pankajam as Rosi
Alummoodan as Vasu
Baby Sumathi as Roshni
Bahadoor as Moideen Kakka/Hameed
E. Madhavan
Junior Sheelaas Jose's Sister
N. Govindankutty as Thankayyan
P. O. Thomas
Philomina as Jose's Mother
S. P. Pillai as Jose's Father
Saraswathi as Sarasu
V. Govindankutty
Veeran as Kunjikkannan
Prema as Sister
Raveendran

Soundtrack
The music was composed by M. S. Viswanathan with lyrics by Vayalar Ramavarma.

Awards
National Film Award-1973     
National Film Award for Best Feature Film in Malayalam

Filmfare Awards South - 1973
Best Film - Malayalam - K.S.R Murthy
Best Director - Malayalam - K. S. Sethumadhavan

Kerala State Film Award-1973
Best Film
Best Director
Best Screenplay
Best Playback Singer

References

External links
 

1973 films
1970s Malayalam-language films
Films based on Indian novels
Films scored by M. S. Viswanathan
Films directed by K. S. Sethumadhavan
Best Malayalam Feature Film National Film Award winners